Timofte is a Romanian surname. Notable persons with this name include:

Daniel Timofte (born 1967), retired Romanian football midfielder and currently a manager
Ion Timofte (born 1967), Romanian retired footballer
Radu Timofte (1949–2009), Romanian soldier, politician and spy chief

See also
Timofti

Romanian-language surnames